Col de la Croix-Haute (el. 1179 m.) is a high mountain pass in the French Dauphiné Alps on the border of the Isère and Drôme departments, linking the towns of Clelles and Mens in the North with Lus-la-Croix-Haute in the South.

See also
 List of highest paved roads in Europe
 List of mountain passes

Croix Haute
Landforms of Isère
Landforms of Drôme
Croix Haute
Transport in Auvergne-Rhône-Alpes
Dauphiné Prealps